Hans-Jürgen Jacobi (born 26 July 1950) is a German athlete. He competed in the men's shot put at the 1980 Summer Olympics.

References

External links
 

1950 births
Living people
Athletes (track and field) at the 1980 Summer Olympics
German male shot putters
Olympic athletes of East Germany
Place of birth missing (living people)